Pełczyce  (Kashubian language: Bersztén) is a town in Choszczno County, West Pomeranian Voivodeship, Poland, with 2,669 inhabitants (2004).

References

External links
 Official town webpage

Cities and towns in West Pomeranian Voivodeship
Choszczno County